You're the Greatest LUVer is a German 1998 compilation album by Dutch girl group Luv' which features hit singles and album tracks from the formation's heyday (1977–1981).

As the female pop trio dominated the charts in a large part of Continental Europe in the late 1970s, Germany was Luv's biggest export market. They had eight entries on the German singles charts: "You're the Greatest Lover" (a #1 hit that reached the gold status as it sold 600.000 units in Germany alone), "Trojan Horse" ( a Top 3 song), "Casanova" (a Top 10 single), "Eeny Meeny Miny Moe", "Ooh, Yes I Do", "Ann-Maria", "One More Little Kissie" and "My Number One".

Album history
In 1979, Patty Brard, José Hoebee, Marga Scheide, their producers (Hans van Hemert and Piet Souer) and their manager (Pim Ter Linde) received the 'Conamus Export Prize' for being 'Holland's best export act'.

Germany was a key territory for the group and helped them to score successful hit records outside their homeland. Luv' was a household name thanks to their performances on German TV shows such as Starparade, Tanzparty, Musikladen  and Disco. During their brief German glory, "You're the Greatest Lover" was used for the soundtrack of an episode of the Derrick TV series. Moreover, Luv' played a cameo role in the 1979 movie Cola, Candy, Chocolate in which they performed "Trojan Horse".

To celebrate the 20th anniversary of the trio success in Goethe's country, Mercury Records decided to release the compilation You're the Greatest LUVer.

Nowadays, the trio's greatest hits (like the "Greatest Lover" and "Trojan Horse") are often included on German 1970's/Disco various artists compilation albums or downloadable as ringtones.

Track listing
All tracks written by Hans van Hemert and Piet Souer under the pseudonym 'Janschen & Janschens'.

 "You're the Greatest Lover" – 2:51
 Taken from the album With Luv' (1978)
 "Casanova" – 3:51
 Taken from the album Lots of Luv' (1979a)
 "U.O.me (Waldolala)" – 2:58
 Taken from the album With Luv' (1978)
 "My Number One" – 3:11
 Taken from the album Forever Yours (1980)
 "Shoes off (Boots on)" – 3:07
 Taken from the album Lots of Luv' (1979a)
 "Don Juanito De Carnaval" – 3:12
 Taken from the album With Luv' (1978)
 "Trojan Horse" – 3:25
 Taken from the German edition of the With Luv' (1978) album
 "Louis Je T'Adore" – 2:36
 B-side of "My Man", taken from the album With Luv' (1978)
 "Don't Let Me Down" – 3:36
 B-side of "Eeny Meeny Miny Moe", taken from the album With Luv' (1978)
 "Eeny Meeny Miny Moe – 2:59
 Taken from the album Lots of Luv' (1979a)
 "DJ" – 3:20
 B-side of "Casanova", taken from the album Lots of Luv' (1979a)
 "Ooh, Yes I Do" – 2:58
 Taken from the album True Luv' (1979b)
 "Ann-Maria – 4:41
 Taken from the album 'True Luv' (1979b)
 "One More Little Kissie" – 3:46
 Taken from the album Forever Yours (1980)
 "Tingalingaling" – 2:31
 Taken from the album Forever Yours (1980)
 "Marcellino – 3:14
 Taken from the album Lots of Luv' (1979a)
 "I Like Sugar Candy Kisses" – 3:36
 Taken from the album Lots of Luv' (1979a)
 "If You Love Me" – 2:34
 Taken from the album Lots of Luv' (1979a)
 "I.M.U.R" – 3:36
 B-side of "Eeny Meeny Miny Moe", taken from the album Lots of Luv''' (1979a)
 "Luv' Hitpack (Medley)" – 4:32
 Taken from the single "Luv' Hitpack" (1989)

Personnel
 José Hoebee – vocals
 Patty Brard – vocals
 Marga Scheide – vocals
 Ria Thielsch – vocals

Production
 Hans van Hemert – producer, songwriter
 Piet Souer – conductor/arranger
 Peter Slaghuis – remix on track 20

References

External links
 Detailed Luv' discography at Rate Your Music
 Detailed Luv' discography at Discogs

Luv' albums
1998 greatest hits albums